The Plateau: Capital of Evil is a 1982 role-playing game adventure published by Entertainment Concepts.

Contents
The Plateau: Capital of Evil is a universal adventure for non-technological RPGs, in which players do not know which evil is about to take place, only that they must stop it.

Reception
Thearin R. Wendel reviewed The Plateau Capital of Evil in The Space Gamer No. 62. Wendel commented that "I think it is a very worthwhile adventure for the GM who doesn't mind creating his own NPCs, magical item strength, and monsters."

References

Fantasy role-playing game adventures
Role-playing game supplements introduced in 1982